Aphnaeus is a genus of butterflies in the family Lycaenidae. The species of this genus are found in the Afrotropical realm.

Species
Aphnaeus abriana Collins & Libert, 2013
Aphnaeus adamsi Stempffer, 1954
Aphnaeus affinis Riley, 1921
Aphnaeus argyrocyclus Holland, 1890
Aphnaeus asterius Plötz, 1880
Aphnaeus boormani Libert, 2013
Aphnaeus brahami Lathy, 1903
Aphnaeus cameruna Libert, 2013
Aphnaeus chapini (Holland, 1920)
Aphnaeus charboneli Bouyer & Libert, 1996
Aphnaeus curlei Libert & Collins, 2013
Aphnaeus ebogo Libert, 2013
Aphnaeus erikssoni Trimen, 1891
Aphnaeus flavescens Stempffer, 1954
Aphnaeus gilloni Stempffer, 1966
Aphnaeus herbuloti Stempffer, 1971
Aphnaeus hutchinsonii Trimen, 1887
Aphnaeus jacksoni Stempffer, 1954
Aphnaeus jefferyi Hawker-Smith, 1928
Aphnaeus kiellandi Stempffer, 1972
Aphnaeus liberti Bouyer, 1996
Aphnaeus marci Collins & Larsen, 2008
Aphnaeus marshalli Neave, 1910
Aphnaeus mashunae Stempffer, 1954
Aphnaeus mirabilis Sáfián, Libert & Collins, 2013
Aphnaeus neavei Bethune-Baker, 1926
Aphnaeus nimbaensis Sáfián, Libert & Collins, 2013
Aphnaeus nyanzae Stempffer, 1954
Aphnaeus orcas (Drury, 1782)
Aphnaeus questiauxi Aurivillius, 1903
Aphnaeus rex Aurivillius, 1909
Aphnaeus safiani Libert, 2013
Aphnaeus suk Libert, 2013
Aphnaeus williamsi Carcasson, 1964
Aphnaeus zanzibarensis Grose-Smith, 1889

External links
"Aphnaeus Hübner, [1819]" at Markku Savela's Lepidoptera and Some Other Life Forms
 Royal Museum of Central Africa Images
Seitz, A. Die Gross-Schmetterlinge der Erde 13: Die Afrikanischen Tagfalter. Plate XIII 69

 
Lycaenidae genera
Taxa named by Jacob Hübner